The men's decathlon at the 2022 World Athletics Championships was held at the Hayward Field in Eugene on 23 and 24 July 2022. Kevin Mayer was the winner of the competition with a score of 8816 points.

Records
Before the competition records were as follows:

Qualification standard
The standard to qualify automatically for entry was 8350 points.

Schedule
The event schedule, in local time (UTC−7), was as follows:

Results

100 metres 
The 100 metres event was started on 23 July at 9:50.

Long jump 
The long jump event was started on 23 July at 10:40.

Shot put 
The shot put event was started on 23 July at 12:10.

High jump 
The high jump event was started on 23 July at 12:10.

400 metres 
The 400 metres event was started on 23 July at 18:55.

110 metres hurdles 
The 110 metres hurdles event was started on 24 July at 09:35.

Discus throw 
The discus throw event was started on 24 July at 10:30.

Pole vault 
The pole vault event started on 24 July at 17:05.

Javelin throw 
The javelin throw event started on 24 July at 17:05.

1500 metres 
The 1500 metres event started on 24 July at 19:20.

Final standings 

The final standings were as follows:

References

Decathlon
Decathlon at the World Athletics Championships